Rock & Roll Hall of Fame Covers EP is  EP compilation by American rock band Red Hot Chili Peppers, released in 2012 through iTunes as a digital-only download. The band first announced the EP through their website on April 19, 2012 with the title We Salute You, although it was changed on the date of the release. The EP consists of six cover songs, live and in the studio, of previous Rock and Roll Hall of Fame inductees all who influenced the band. The EP was released to commemorate the band's own induction into the Rock and Roll Hall of Fame in 2012. All six songs have been previously featured on other releases by the band. Four of the six tracks had never been released digitally before.

“A Teenager in Love” was released as one of the B-Sides on the By the Way single, "Search and Destroy" first appeared as a B-Side on the "Give It Away" and "Under the Bridge" singles, “I Get Around” was performed during Brian Wilson’s 2005 MusiCares tribute and only a DVD performance has been released, “Suffragette City” was previously only available as a B-side to the band’s 1996 single “Aeroplane”, “Everybody Knows This Is Nowhere” was recorded live during Red Hot Chili Peppers’ 2011–2012 world tour supporting their album I'm with You and first released through the band's website on one of their official bootlegs, and "Havana Affair" first appeared on We're a Happy Family: A Tribute to Ramones. It was also available digitally as the iTunes bonus track for Stadium Arcadium upon its 2007 rerelease, but was quickly removed for unknown reasons. This release means it is available digitally once again.

Track listing

Personnel
Red Hot Chili Peppers
 Anthony Kiedis – lead vocals
 Josh Klinghoffer – guitar, backing vocals (4)
 Flea – bass, backing vocals
 Chad Smith – drums, percussion
 John Frusciante – guitar, backing vocals (1-3, 5), production (1)
 Dave Navarro – guitar (6)

Additional musicians
Mauro Refosco – percussion (4)
Chris Warren – keyboards (4)

References

External links
Red Hot Chili Peppers website
Rock & Roll Hall of Fame Covers EP download

Red Hot Chili Peppers EPs
2012 EPs
Albums produced by Rick Rubin